Vouvant is a commune in the department of Vendée, in the Pays de la Loire region in western France.

Vouvant is labelled as Les Plus Beaux Villages de France (since 1988), Petite cité de caractère, and the village has obtained two flowers out of five in the Concours des villes et villages fleuris.

It is the only fortified village of Vendée. Its inhabitants are called Vouvantais. Over 10% of the population of Vouvant is British owing to a gradual occupation or purchase of real estate by English families.

Sites and monuments
Several sites and monuments are present in Vouvant :
 Walled enclosure of the Lusignan (dated between the end of the 12th century and the beginning of the 13th century) : the Tour Mélusine (keep of the castle), the fortifications around the village, the Postern Gate, etc. The Tour Mélusine has been protected as a monument historique by the French Ministry of Culture since 1927. The city fortifications has been protected as a monument historique since 1984.
 Notre-Dame de l'Assomption Church, classed as a monument historique in 1840 by Prosper Mérimée, built from the 11th century under the leadership of William V, Duke of Aquitaine : Théodelin'''s nave (11th century) / crypt (11th century, modified in the 12th century and rebuilt during restoration works in 1882–1884 for the ceiling) / square gable wall of the north portal, choir, apse and two small apses (second half of the 12th century) / triangular gable wall of the north portal and Gothic sculptures (1458–1464) / transept and the first three spans of the nave (wholly rebuilt during restoration works in 1882–1890).
 Medieval bridge (dated between the 13th and the 15th centuries), protected as a monument historique since 1927.
 Reproduction of the Grotto of Lourdes, on the bank of the Mère'' river. Realized in 1958.
 Public washing place.
 Forest of Mervent-Vouvant, Vendée's largest forest.

See also
Communes of the Vendée department

References

Communes of Vendée
Plus Beaux Villages de France